The 44th National Film Awards, presented by Directorate of Film Festivals, the organisation set up by Ministry of Information and Broadcasting, India to felicitate the best of Indian Cinema released in the year 1996. The awards were announced on 6 May 1997, and presented in July.

Awards 

Awards were divided into feature films, non-feature films and books written on Indian cinema.

Lifetime Achievement Award 
Introduced in 1969, the Dadasaheb Phalke Award is the highest award given to recognise the contributions of film personalities towards the development of Indian cinema and for distinguished contributions to the medium, its growth and promotion.

Feature films 

Feature films were awarded at All India as well as regional level. For 44th National Film Awards, a Bengali film, Lal Darja won the National Film Award for Best Feature Film, whereas a Tamil film, Minsara Kanavu won the maximum number of awards (4). Following were the awards given in each category:

Juries 

A committee headed by T. Subbarami Reddy was appointed to evaluate the feature films awards. Following were the jury members:

 Jury Members
 T. Subbarami Reddy (Chairperson)Basu ChatterjeeCharuhasanMadhuMike PandeyNirad N. MohapatraVijaya Mulay
Raghav MenonSushma ShiromaniJwngdao BodosaM. S. SathyuG. VenkateswaranD. RamanaiduSwaraj LambaSwapan Kumar Ghosh

All India Award 

Following were the awards given:

Golden Lotus Award 

Official Name: Swarna Kamal

All the awardees are awarded with 'Golden Lotus Award (Swarna Kamal)', a certificate and cash prize.

Silver Lotus Award 

Official Name: Rajat Kamal

All the awardees are awarded with 'Silver Lotus Award (Rajat Kamal)', a certificate and cash prize.

Regional Awards 

The award is given to best film in the regional languages in India.

Non-Feature Films 

Short Films made in any Indian language and certified by the Central Board of Film Certification as a documentary/newsreel/fiction are eligible for non-feature film section.

Juries 

A committee headed by N. S. Thapa was appointed to evaluate the non-feature films awards. Following were the jury members:

 Jury Members
 N. S. Thapa (Chairperson)Swapna SundariMeera DewanSukumaranPunathil Kunjabdulla

Golden Lotus Award 

Official Name: Swarna Kamal

All the awardees are awarded with 'Golden Lotus Award (Swarna Kamal)', a certificate and cash prize.

Silver Lotus Award 

Official Name: Rajat Kamal

All the awardees are awarded with 'Silver Lotus Award (Rajat Kamal)' and cash prize.

Best Writing on Cinema 

The awards aim at encouraging study and appreciation of cinema as an art form and dissemination of information and critical appreciation of this art-form through publication of books, articles, reviews etc.

Juries 

A committee headed by Khalid Mohamed was appointed to evaluate the writing on Indian cinema. Following were the jury members:

 Jury Members
 Khalid Mohamed (Chairperson)Pritiman SarkarV. K. Madhavan Kutty

Golden Lotus Award 
Official Name: Swarna Kamal

All the awardees are awarded with 'Golden Lotus Award (Swarna Kamal)' and cash prize.

Awards not given 

Following were the awards not given as no film was found to be suitable for the award:

 Best Film on Environment / Conservation / Preservation
 Best Feature Film in Manipuri
 Best Feature Film in Punjabi
 Best Feature Film in English
 Best Non-Feature Film Direction
 Best Anthropological / Ethnographic Film
 Best Promotional Film
 Best Scientific Film
 Best Environment / Conservation / Preservation Film
 Best Agricultural Film
 Best Historical Reconstruction / Compilation Film
 Best Exploration / Adventure Film
 Best Music Direction

References

External links 
 National Film Awards Archives
 Official Page for Directorate of Film Festivals, India

National Film Awards (India) ceremonies
1997 Indian film awards